Spark is a 1998 film directed by Garret Williams and starring Terrence Howard and Nicole Ari Parker. Williams made his directorial debut with this tale of an urban black couple trapped in a desert town of rednecks after their car breaks down after hitting a dog. Byron (Terrence Howard) and Nina (Nicole Ari Parker) are driving a BMW from Chicago to L.A. to take Nina to school when they experience a back-road breakdown. Teen Mooney (Brendan Sexton III) tows them to a white-trailer-trash town where they are charged $500 for repairs. When the BMW dies again, they stay overnight in a motel, and the situation soon gets grim as Byron starts spending more time with Mooney and his true colors start to show revealing a disturbing town story. The characters in the low-budgeter were first introduced in a 1996 short. Spark was shown at 1998 film festivals (Sundance, Berlin).

Cast
 Terrence Howard as Byron
 Nicole Ari Parker as Nina
 Sandra Ellis Lafferty as Deb
 Brendan Sexton III as Mooney
 Timothy McNeil as Stuart
 Tom Gilroy as Jack
 George Gerdes as Earl
 Dewey Weber as Tobey
 William Prael as Deputy
 William Bell as Otis

Release
Spark was released on DVD on May 15, 2007.

External links
 

1998 films
1998 drama films
American LGBT-related films
LGBT-related drama films
1998 LGBT-related films
1990s English-language films
1990s American films